Nggwahyi (Ngwaxi, Ngwohi) is a minor Chadic language of Nigeria. Nggwahyi is considered a threatened language.

References

Biu-Mandara languages
Languages of Nigeria
Endangered Afroasiatic languages